Ischnolea bimaculata is a species of beetle in the family Cerambycidae. It was described by Chevrolat in 1861. It is known from Argentina, Brazil, and Paraguay.

References

Desmiphorini
Beetles described in 1861